Brakel is a town in the district of Höxter in North Rhine-Westphalia, Germany.

Geography

Location 
Brakel lies at the midpoint of the district of Höxter between the Eggegebirge and the Weser in the Oberwälder Land nature area in the old Saxon region of Nethegau.

Constituent communities 
Brakel consists of the following centres:

Heggedörfer 
Auenhausen (population 130), Frohnhausen (population 309) and Hampenhausen (population 54) are Brakel's highest constituent communities, and are sometimes also known as the Heggedörfer. Between 1142 and 1147, these three villages had their first documentary mention. In the 12th and 13th centuries, the Gehrden Monastery had holdings in these three villages. The Heggedörfer, along with the town of Gehrden, were amalgamated into the greater community of Brakel after the old district of Warburg was dissolved.

Beller 
Beller has a population of 187.
The village is named by the great fish called "Beller", that joined the rITArd UG in 880.

Bellersen 
Bellersen lies on the edge of the extensive woods in the Bruch Valley. Bellersen is said to be "North Rhine-Westphalia's Model Tourism Village". Bellersen has earned international fame as "Dorf B." in the Judenbuche by Annette von Droste-Hülshoff. Bellersen is home to 704 inhabitants.

Bökendorf 
In 1965, this village celebrated its one-thousandth anniversary of existence. The Schloss Bökendorf (stately home) was the centre of the "Circle of Romantics" with Annette von Droste-Hülshoff, the Brothers Grimm, Clemens von Brentano and Josef Görres. It is known today for its open-air stage. Bökendorf has 852 inhabitants.

Erkeln 
The village's forerunner, a group of farms, was first mentioned in the ninth century. There are 644 inhabitants in Erkeln.

Gehrden 
This titular town was first mentioned in 868. Idyllically set in the Oese Valley on the eastern slopes of the Eggegebirge, Gehrden is said to be a tourism destination. The former Benedictine abbey there, founded in 1142, had great influence and several landholdings in the Warburger Land until its seizure by the state in 1810. Gehrden was incorporated into the greater community of Brakel after the old Warburg District was dissolved in 1975. Until then, Gehrden had belonged to the Amt of Dringenberg-Gehrden. The Romanesque monastery church has Westphalia's greatest peal of bells. In the Klosterpark (Monastery Park) stands Germany's third-oldest linden tree, the Zwölfapostel Linde (Twelve Apostles Linden), which was planted by the Benedictine nuns shortly after the monastery was founded. There are 961 inhabitants in Gehrden.

Hembsen 
Already first mentioned in the year 800, Hembsen lies in the middle of the heavily wooded heights of the Nethegau, and has 1,084 inhabitants.

Istrup 
Istrup has 707 inhabitants.

Rheder 
Rheder has 324 inhabitants and is known for the Schlossbräuerei Rheder, a brewery rich in tradition. The very tasty golden pilsener brewed here is very famous and is consumed by the locals at the several "Schützenfeste" in this region. Some say that Rhederpils is one of the best beers all over Germany, probably even the world.

Riesel 
Riesel has 610 inhabitants.

Schmechten 
Schmechten has 224 inhabitants.

Siddessen 
Siddessen has 504 inhabitants.

Population figures are as at 31 December 2003.

History 
Brakel had its first documentary mention in 836 as "villa brechal" in writings by the Benedictine monks. After the lords of Brakel died out in the late 13th century, Hinnenburg Castle on a hill above Brakel was inherited by the House of Asseburg, owning it to this day. The medieval castle was reconstructed around 1600 in the Weser Renaissance style. Brakel developed itself into quite an important trading town that belonged to the Hanseatic League. In the 14th century, this Hanseatic town was at the height of its boom, bearing the same rank as Paderborn and Warburg, bearing witness to which was the town's having its own court and market rights. The general situation worsened in the 15th century. In the outer regions, the Brede Monastery was founded.

The Thirty Years' War also left traces in Brakel. In 1803, Prussia took over the town and appointed Brakel a district seat. After a brief period of French rule in Napoleonic times, the district seat had to be yielded permanently to Höxter in 1832.

On 1 January 1970, the formerly independent communities of Beller, Bellersen, Bökendorf, Erkeln, Hembsen, Hinnenburg, Istrup, Rheder, Riesel and Schmechten merged with the town.

As part of the 5 November 1974 state law aimed at municipal reform, Höxter district and the old district of Warburg were amalgamated. The formerly independent communities of Auenhausen, Frohnhausen, Hampenhausen and Siddessen, along with the town of Gehrden were made parts of Brakel.

There was talk at the time of making Brakel the new district seat, its central location being seen as a point in its favour. However, any ambition that Brakel had to become the new district's capital was never realized, as Höxter kept the district seat.

Between 1966 and 1995, Brakel was a garrison town, hosting the 43rd Artillery Battalion from Belgium.

The town's development strong points today are as follows:
 Bringing industrial concerns to town, especially in woodworking, metalworking, textile-working and plastics;
 Being named a climatic spa, and expanding tourism;
 Offering multifaceted educational opportunities, favoured by Brakel's central location.

Hanseatic League 
Brakel's Hanseatic roots go back to its early history and stretch through the Middle Ages. From the first written reference to "villa brechal" in 836 (in connection with transferring Saint Vitus's bones from Saint Denis, France, to Corvey) through to the 12th century, when it was the seat of the Lords of Brakel, the town found itself centrally located by virtue of two old commercial roads that crossed here. Moreover, the topography made expansion possible in the Early Middle Ages.

Long-distance traders thereby had a decisive share in Brakel's development, being as they were part of the leading class in many Westphalian towns. The Hellweglinie, a mediaeval commercial road network that ran through Brakel, was the basis for long-distance trade.

As a principal town of the Hanseatic city of Paderborn, Brakel became a member of the Hanseatic League, putting Brakel in early contact with Hanseatic trade. Particularly in the 13th and 14th centuries, Brakel developed itself by fostering long-distance trade activities as far away as the Baltic Sea coast. Bearing witness to these Hanseatic activities are Brakel coins showing up in Baltic Sea towns at the time (15th century).

On 25 June 1983, representatives from 20 former Hanseatic towns, in an initiative arising from the towns' common history, founded the Wesphalian Hanseatic League (Westfälischer Hansebund), with Brakel as one of the founding members. The number of members has since risen to 40. The League's goals are, among others, to foster Wesphalian Hanseatic towns' self-awareness, to contribute to their self-presentation and to emphasize commonalities among these Hanseatic towns. Already, since 1984, it has become traditional to hold a yearly Westphalian Hansetag (Hanseatic assembly). The Hansetage are made attractive and informative to visitors with interesting cultural, touristic and sporting events (parades, farmers', craftsmen's and merchants market, theatre, evening events)

Politics

Town council 

Town council's 34 seats are apportioned as follows, in accordance with municipal elections held on 13 September 2021:
CDU 17 seats
SPD 5 seats
Greens 5 seats
 CWG 4 seats
 Liste Zukunft 2 seats
 without party affiliation 1 seat
Note: CWG is a citizens' coalition.

Coat of arms, banner and flag 
Brakel's civic coat of arms might heraldically be described thus: In gules two pointed-roofed towers argent joined at the tops by a decorative gable argent, beneath the gable and between the towers an inescutcheon, in which, in vert three pallets argent across which a raised fess gules, therein three orbs Or.

The inescutcheon – the smaller shield within the bigger one – which already appeared on Brakel's coins in 1227, is the arms of the Lords of Brakel, who were the town's overlords until their male line died out in 1268. On the south side of the Town Hall is found an armorial stone, believed to be from the 16th century, that only shows the Lords' arms. Even written records from Paderborn in the 18th century contain only this inner shield as Brakel's coat of arms. From the late 13th century, the town of Brakel used a seal whose composition matches the blazon given above. A seal stamp used beginning in 1316 is still kept in the town archive today. When the coat of arms was newly adopted in 1907, the town chose to have the 1316 seal stamp composition in its arms. The colours seen in the inescutcheon are simply the town's colours, as the old Lords' armorial colours are unknown. In this form, the coat of arms was given Royal approval on 18 March 1908.

The town's banner is striped green and white lengthwise with the coat of arms in the middle of the upper half. Written above the coat of arms is "Stadt", and underneath "Brakel" ("Stadt Brakel" means "Town of Brakel")

The town's flag is striped green and white lengthwise with the coat of arms in the middle, but towards the hoist.

Transport 
Brakel lies at the crossroads of Federal Highways (Bundesstraßen) B 64 (Münster-Paderborn-Brakel-Seesen-Halle-Leipzig) and B 252 (Blomberg-Brakel-Korbach-Marburg).

The town also lies on the Paderborn-Holzminden-Braunschweig railway line, and has a station. The station is served by, among others, hourly trains from the "Egge-Bahn" (Paderborn - Holzminden), run by the NordWestBahn belonging to Transdev.

Education 
 Gesamtschule Brakel
 Fachhochschule für Finanzen, Brakel branch
 Adolph Kolping Berufsbildungswerk Brakel ("professional education works")
 Gymnasium Brede (free school in Catholic sponsorship)
 Realschule Brede
 Berufskolleg Brede ("professional college")
 Städtische Gemeinschaftsgrundschule Brakel

Famous people 

Johann Georg Rudolphi, (1633-1693), important Baroque painter

August Franz von Haxthausen (1792-1866), agricultural scientist, economist, lawyer, writer, and collector of folk songs 
Solomon Bibo (1853-1934), Jewish/Native Indian leader
Petrus Legge, (1882-1951), former Bishop of Meissen
Johannes Weinrich, (born 1947), terrorist, member of the Revolutionary Cells (German group)
Michael Wollitz, (born 1961), German football player
Jürgen Herrmann, (1962-2012), German politician
Claus-Dieter Wollitz, (born 1965), German football player and trainer

Annentag 
The Annentag in Brakel is the biggest church fair in the Weserbergland, held every year on the weekend of the first Sunday in August.

Town partnerships 
Brakel maintains partnership links with the following places:
  Wetteren, Belgium
  Zirkow, Germany

References

External links 
  
 Bellersen
 Bökendorf
 Bökendorf outdoor stage
 Hembsen
 Erkeln
 Gehrden
 Hembsen
 Istrup
 Riesel
 Brakel in the Kulturatlas Westfalen
 Modern-day Hanse
 Brakel trade federation
 Städtisches Petrus-Legge Gymnasium
 Fachhochschule für Finanzen, Außenstelle Brakel
 Fachschule für Sozialpädagogik
 Adolph Kolping Berufsbildungswerk Brakel
 Gymnasium Brede
 Berufskolleg Brede

Towns in North Rhine-Westphalia
Höxter (district)
Members of the Hanseatic League